Greta Hodgkinson O.Ont (born August 1973) is an American-Canadian ballet dancer. She was a principal dancer with the National Ballet of Canada until she stepped down in 2020. She will continue to perform freelance and become the artist-in residence of the National Ballet.

Early life and training
Hodgkinson was born in Providence, Rhode Island. Her maternal grandparents are Armenian. She took part in dancing, ice-skating and gymnastics as a child. She left her family and started training at Canada's National Ballet School in Toronto, skipping seventh grade.

Career
Hodgkinson graduated into National Ballet of Canada in 1990, shortly before her 17th birthday. In 1996, she was promoted to the rank of Principal Dancer. During her career, she has danced classical roles such as the title role in Giselle, Sugar Plum Fairy in The Nutcracker and Juliet in Romeo and Juliet, as well as contemporary work by choreographers such as Jiří Kylián, Christopher Wheeldon and Wayne McGregor.

Outside of the company, Hodgkinson has danced with multiple companies as a guest artist, including Mariinsky Ballet, Teatro alla Scala, The Royal Ballet and Stuttgart Ballet. She has also appeared in many international galas. One of her frequent partner is Roberto Bolle.

In 2009, Hodgkinson portrayed Margot Fonteyn in TV movie Nureyev. She also appeared in 2013 documentary Ballet's Greatest Hits, dancing excerpts from Giselle, with Matthew Golding as Albrecht and Stella Abrera as Myrtha.

In 2017, Hodgkinson was appointed to the Order of Ontario.

In March 2020, Hodgkinson danced her final performance with the National Ballet. She chose to dance Marguerite in Marguerite and Armand, as she wanted to dance a new role rather than reprising a past role. Guillaume Côté partnered her in that performance. She is set to work on several independent projects with her former colleagues, Skyler Campbell and Côté. She will assumed the role of Artist-in-Residence with the National Ballet in the 2020-21 season.

Personal life
Hodgkinson is married to Etienne Lavigne, a principal character artist with the National Ballet of Canada. They have two children. She is a dual citizen of United States and Canada. She enjoys hosting dinner parties and going to the movies, where she claims that she never walks out because she likes the entire cinema-going experience. Although she finds the task demanding, Hodgkinson attempts to answer all her fan mail. She says she is flattered when ballet fans take the time to write her.

Honours
Two Citations from the State of Rhode Island, in recognition of her extraordinary talents, accomplishments and outstanding contribution to arts and culture in the US
Order of Ontario, 2017

References

External links

Article on Greta Hodgkinson from Dance Magazine
Greta Hodgkinson page at National Ballet of Canada website
Rhode Island Dance website article on Greta Hodgkinson
National Ballet's Greta Hodgkinson weds fellow dancer
Interview with Greta Hodgkinson by The Poetry Extension

American ballerinas
American female dancers
Canadian ballerinas
Canadian female dancers
American people of Armenian descent
Canadian people of Armenian descent
American emigrants to Canada
American expatriates in Canada
1973 births
Living people
People from Providence, Rhode Island
National Ballet of Canada principal dancers
Members of the Order of Ontario
Dancers from Rhode Island
Prima ballerinas
21st-century American ballet dancers
21st-century Canadian dancers
21st-century American women